William Walmsley, (5 April 1687, in Lichfield – 18 September 1730, in Packington) was Dean of Lichfield from 1720 until his death.

Walmesley was educated at Trinity College, Cambridge. He was Chaplain to Edward Villiers, 1st Earl of Jersey; and also held livings at Mavesyn Ridware and Packington.

References

Alumni of Trinity College, Cambridge
People from Lichfield
18th-century English Anglican priests
Deans of Lichfield
1687 births
1730 deaths
Holders of a Lambeth degree